Suzanne Eaton (December 23, 1959 – July 2, 2019) was an American scientist and professor of molecular biology at the Max Planck Institute of Molecular Cell Biology and Genetics in Dresden, Germany.

Early life and education 
Eaton was born on December 23, 1959, in Oakland, California. One of Eaton's self-confessed role models as a child was Spock, due to his rational approach to problem solving. She was also a talented pianist, having played since the age of eight.

As an undergraduate, Eaton was torn between a career as a biologist, a comparative literature professor, or a mathematician. The deciding factor was a course that was taught from primary literature instead of a textbook, sparking an enthusiasm for biological research.

Eaton completed a B.S. in biology at Brown University in 1981 before earning a Ph.D. in microbiology at University of California, Los Angeles in 1988. Her thesis, entitled Molecular analysis of an immunoglobulin heavy chain promoter, was completed under the supervision of Kathryn Calame. She was awarded the Sydney C. Rittenberg Award for Distinguished Academic Achievement in Microbiology by the Association of Academic Women in 1988 for her doctoral work.

Career and research 
Eaton began her research career working on immunoglobulin heavy chain genes at University of California, Los Angeles, in the laboratory of Kathryn Calame. In 1988, Eaton switched fields to developmental biology, investigating how cells obtain their tissue identities in the fruit fly, Drosophila melanogaster, while in the group of Thomas B. Kornberg at University of California, San Francisco. Eaton moved to Germany in 1993 to work at the European Molecular Biology Laboratory in Heidelberg in the group of Kai Simons, where she combined her expertise in microbiology and developmental biology to investigate how the cytoskeleton helps cells attain their polarity in tissues, using the fruit fly as a model system. In 2000, Eaton became one of the founding members of the Max Planck Institute of Molecular Cell Biology and Genetics in Dresden, Germany, where her group investigated how signaling molecules and mechanical properties of cells act together to shape tissues in the fruit fly. In 2015, she became professor of developmental cell biology of invertebrates at the TU Dresden.

Awards and honors 
 1977: New York State Regents Scholar
 1988: Association of Academic Women, Sydney C. Rittenberg Award for Distinguished Academic Achievement in Microbiology
 2006: Women in Cell Biology Junior Award for Excellence in Research, American Society for Cell Biology.

Personal life 
Eaton was married to the British scientist, Anthony A. Hyman. The couple had two children. She was an athlete and runner, and had a black belt in Taekwondo.

After her death, her sister wrote: "She took great pleasure in preparing exquisite meals and had an exotic fashion sense. She loved perfume. She taught and practiced Tae Kwon Do as a second-degree black belt. She finished crossword puzzles way too quickly, played concertos, and read extensively. She fit Jane Austen’s strictest description of an 'accomplished woman' while maintaining a natural humility and 'insatiable curiosity'".

Disappearance and death 
Eaton disappeared on July 2, 2019. She was last seen playing the piano in the hotel lobby where she was attending a conference at the Orthodox Academy in Chania, Crete. It is believed that her disappearance occurred during a run. Greek police found her body on July 8 inside a World War II bunker. A homicide investigation was opened after it was determined that she died by asphyxiation. Giannis (also spelled Yiannis) Paraskakis, a Greek 27–year–old and married father of two, admitted during police questioning to striking her twice with his car, knocking her unconscious, and loading her into his trunk. He then drove to the remote bunker, where he raped her and left her to die. In October, 2020, Paraskakis was convicted of Eaton's murder and given a life sentence.

Memorial fund 
In honor of Eaton's interdisciplinary legacy to the scientific community, the Institute of Molecular Biotechnology in Austria instated a memorial fund with the stated aim to support young scientists' endeavors in interdisciplinary topics. In March 2021, the European Molecular Biology Organization (EMBO) launched a New Venture Fellowship  in memory of Suzanne Eaton and supports young researchers from across the life sciences to enter a new field or bring a new direction to their work.

See also
List of kidnappings
List of solved missing person cases

Selected publications 
 Eaton, Suzanne (July 1995). "Apical, basal, and lateral cues for epithelial polarization." Cell. 82: 5.
 Eaton, Suzanne (December 1996). "Roles for Rac1 and Cdc42 in planar polarization and hair outgrowth in the wing of Drosophila." Journal of Cell Biology. 135: 1277.
 Eaton, Suzanne (May 2005). "Lipoprotein particles are required for Hedgehog and Wingless signalling." Nature. 435: 58.
 Eaton, Suzanne (September 2010). "Cell Flow Reorients the Axis of Planar Polarity in the Wing Epithelium of Drosophila." Cell. 142: 773.

References

External links

Suzanne Eaton Memorial Fund

1959 births
2010s missing person cases
2019 deaths
20th-century American biologists
20th-century American pianists
20th-century American women scientists
21st-century American biologists
21st-century American pianists
21st-century American women scientists
American expatriate academics
American expatriates in Germany
American female taekwondo practitioners
American microbiologists
American molecular biologists
American people murdered abroad
American women academics
American women biologists
American women pianists
Brown University alumni
Female murder victims
Formerly missing people
Deaths from asphyxiation
Missing person cases in Greece
Scientists from California
Academic staff of TU Dresden
Women microbiologists
Women molecular biologists
Writers from Oakland, California
University of California, Los Angeles alumni
Violence against women in Greece